Single-chamber may refer to:

 Single-chamber government, a government having only one legislative or parliamentary chamber
 Single-chamber pacemaker, a pacemaker in which only one pacing lead is placed into a chamber of the heart